Staten Island Pavilion is a 3,000-seat multi-purpose arena in Staten Island, New York.  It hosts various local concerts and sporting events for the area and was the home arena for the Staten Island Xtreme of the National Indoor Football League in 2004.

Indoor arenas in New York City
Sports venues in Staten Island